Echinomastus erectocentrus is a species of cactus known by the common names redspine fishhook cactus, redspine butterfly cactus, acuña cactus, needle-spine pineapple cactus, red pineapple cactus, and purple-spine viznagita. It is native to Arizona and New Mexico in the United States and Sonora in Mexico.

This cactus grows up to about 34 centimeters tall by 10 wide. There are many spines on each areole, the central ones up to 4.4 centimeters in length. The spines are purple, pink, or white with brown tips. The flower is up to 6 centimeters long by 9 wide and has white, pink, or lavender tepals with greenish, brown, or reddish coloration at the bases. This species is similar to Echinomastus johnsonii. It is the first cactus to bloom in Organ Pipe Cactus National Monument, flowering in early March.

This species grows on limestone.

There are two varieties, var. acunensis and var. erectocentrus. These are not easily told apart using morphological characteristics, but they occur in different geographical areas. The former occurs in northern Sonora and north to Florence, Arizona, and the latter occurs around Tucson and areas east.

Conservation 
E. e. var. acunensis (referred to as the acuña cactus) is recognized as an endangered species under the Endangered Species Act of 1973. The main threat to this taxa is failure to recruit new individuals to the population by successful germination of seeds and survival of seedlings. Though the population is currently stable, if no new plants can be grown in the wild, the population is expected to crash around 2070. Unlike similar species, it is not expected to be strongly affected by the effects of climate change.

References

Cactoideae
Flora of Arizona
Flora of New Mexico
Flora of Sonora
Cacti of the United States
Cacti of Mexico
Endangered flora of North America